Ryan Lorthridge (born July 27, 1972) is a retired American professional basketball player. He played college basketball at Jackson State University.

Professional career
Lorthridge played in 37 games NBA with Golden State Warriors, in the 1994–95 season. He also played in the CBA and the IBL, during his professional career. In addition to that, Lorthridge also played professionally in Europe, the Israeli Super League, the Venezuelan Professional League, Argentine National League, and in the Puerto Rican Super League. He was the Greek All-Star Game's slam dunk contest winner in 2002.

External links 
NBA.com Profile
NBA Career Stats
Italian League Profile 
Greek Basketball League statistics
Polish League Profile 
Puerto Rican League Profile 
NCAA College Stats

1972 births
Living people
American expatriate basketball people in Argentina
American expatriate basketball people in Greece
American expatriate basketball people in Italy
American expatriate basketball people in Mexico
American expatriate basketball people in Venezuela
American men's basketball players
Basketball players from Nashville, Tennessee
Florida Beachdogs players
Golden State Warriors players
Gymnastikos S. Larissas B.C. players
Jackson State Tigers basketball players
K.A.O.D. B.C. players
Mexico Aztecas players
Point guards
Rockford Lightning players
Scaligera Basket Verona players
Shooting guards
Trenton Shooting Stars players
Undrafted National Basketball Association players